Doncaster and Bassetlaw Teaching Hospitals NHS Foundation Trust was established in 2004. It runs services at Bassetlaw District General Hospital, Doncaster Royal Infirmary, Montagu Hospital and Retford Hospital, in Nottinghamshire and South Yorkshire, England.

The Trust issued a contract to the Co-operative Pharmacy for seven years for Doncaster Royal Infirmary’s accident and emergency, and outpatient departments in September 2011. A month later it decided to outsource laundry services as it was not able to invest the necessary capital to bring the service up to a satisfactory standard.
In January 2017, the trust received Teaching status adding to its name. Mike Pinkerton resigned and Richard Parker took on the role as chief executive.

In 2022 466 of the staff were from outside the UK - 7.6% of all staff at the trust who declared their nationality.

Performance

The Trust was awarded the Baby Friendly Award from UNICEF and the World Health Organisation, for the high standard of care given to pregnant women and breastfeeding mothers and babies in January 2014.

The director of finance resigned in November 2015 after the discovery of inaccuracies in financial reporting. A £12.6m deficit was discovered where a surplus of £2.2 million had been forecast.  In February 2016 it was expecting a deficit of £38 million for the year.

The trust started using the DrDoctor text messaging service in ophthalmology, gastroenterology and respiratory services in 2019 and urged patients to ensure their contact details were  up-to-date in order to make it effective.

See also
 List of NHS trusts

References

NHS foundation trusts
Health in Nottinghamshire
Health in Yorkshire